M. oryzae may refer to:
 Merizocera oryzae, is a species of spider endemic to Sri Lanka
 Methylobacterium oryzae, a facultatively methylotrophic and aerobic bacterium isolated from tissues of rice
 Mucilaginibacter oryzae, a Gram-negative and non-spore-forming bacterium isolated from rhizosphere